Bakovići is a village in the municipality of Kolašin, Montenegro. Points of  Interest for the tourism industry include the Partisan Memorial Cemetery, the Ski Center Kolasin 1450, the Saint Demetrius Church, as well as the Dulovina Botanical Garden. The climate of Bakovići, Kolašin is snowy during the winter months and sunny during the summer seasons. The local cuisine consists of traditional dollma, veal corba, cicvara, and schnitzel.

Demographics
According to the 2011 census, its population was 130.

References

Populated places in Kolašin Municipality